LP1 is the debut studio album by English singer Liam Payne, released on 6 December 2019 through Capitol Records. The album is hip hop and R&B-orientated, drawing influence from Usher and Justin Timberlake. Reviews for the record were mixed, with critics noting how Payne lacked a distinct identity from the various genres he adopts throughout the track listing.

Background

Following the release of his single "Bedroom Floor" in October 2017, Payne told Hits Radio that his album would be released in January 2018, saying he had worked with Ed Sheeran and that he "didn't really want to nail [him]self down so there's some dark pop on there, some super urban tracks and a lot of trap music". In May 2018, Payne told Good Morning America that the album was to be released on 14 September 2018, and that there was "a good mix of beautiful people on my album, which is amazing". However, in August 2018, Payne announced that he had delayed the release of the album and that he would be releasing his debut EP First Time (2018) to make up for it.

In September 2019, following the release of "Stack It Up", MTV said Payne had "spent much of 2019 in the studio". The same month, Payne revealed to Australian radio station Nova 96.9 that the album was finished, that he was "proud" of it and it is "exactly the way I'd want my first album to sound". He also stated that it is "very hip-hop and R&B-orientated, with lots of artists that I like – an Usher and Justin Timberlake reference throughout".

On 18 October 2019, Payne formally announced the album, its title and that it would be released on 6 December 2019.

Music and lyrics
"Strip That Down" is a trap and hip hop-influenced pop and R&B track. Payne croons over "pulsating" synth-bass and chants with minimalist production style. Lyrically, the song contains themes of wealth, celebrity appeal and newfound career independence. While talking about the song, Payne said: "It just sets a few things straight, but then also the chorus is more about stripping back the music. I like to hear it loud sometimes, but sometimes you got to strip it back." For the concept of the song, Payne stated that they contemplated what Timberlake would release as his debut solo single in 2017. "Familiar" is a Latin, Latin pop and R&B song. According to Billboard, the song "combines Latin vibes with a summery, R&B sound". The lyrics are about impressing a love interest in a nightclub. "Get Low" is a quick-spaced tropical dance, club-pop song that contains light percussion and a lead tropical house synth line. Amid sexually-charged lyrics, Payne talks to a potential lover over "buoyant" synths on the chorus.

Singles
A number of singles were released ahead of the album including: "Strip That Down" featuring Quavo, "Get Low" with Zedd, "Bedroom Floor" and "Familiar" with J Balvin. "For You (Fifty Shades Freed)" with Rita Ora from the Fifty Shades Freed soundtrack, "Polaroid" with Jonas Blue and Lennon Stella from Blue's debut studio album Blue and the Christmas track "All I Want (For Christmas)" are also included as bonus tracks.

"Stack It Up" featuring A Boogie wit da Hoodie was released as the lead single from the album on 16 September 2019. The song "Live Forever" featuring electronic music DJ trio Cheat Codes was also released simultaneously alongside the album on 6 December 2019.

Critical reception

LP1 received mixed reviews. According to Metacritic, which assigns a normalised rating out of 100 to reviews from mainstream critics, the album has an average score of 44 out of 100, which indicates "mixed or average reviews" based on seven reviews. It was the worst reviewed album with seven reviews or more of 2019 on the site.

Helen Brown of The Independent wrote "he's got a nice set of pipes. He gets the songs across. But without imposing any personality on them he's just, well, a singing six-pack" and that "it's all fine: shiny and efficient pop, smelling of body oil and new car upholstery. But Payne treats each track like a rental car. He gives each song a spin and hands the keys back like a good lad without leaving a trace," ending the review by stating "he's gone from One Direction to One Dimensional". Mark Kennedy, writing for ABC News, called the album "embarrassing" while writing that the album "never really gets off the ground, a collection of monotonous club songs that often sound like warmed-over Justin Bieber rejects." He further criticised Payne's decision to add "offerings [that] are more than two years old" and the fact that Payne only co-wrote four songs, although he did compliment "Stack It Up". Laura Snapes of The Guardian opined that it is a "terrible pop album, but very effective contraception". Michael Cragg, also of The Guardian, called the album "genre-ticking anonymity" and "occasionally painful yet weirdly Payne-less." El Hunt of NME felt Payne was "so focused on ticking boxes that he forgets to have fun" and that it "shows a more grown-up side to the former One Direction member, and cherry-picks from pretty much every genre that's in vogue right now. The problem is that it doesn't tell us much about Liam Payne" while particularly talking down on "Both Ways". Hunt did, however, note that the album "can be fun when it does loosen up a little more", naming "Familiar", "Heart Meet Break", and "Bedroom Floor" as standout tracks. Rawiya Kameir of Pitchfork was critical, calling Payne "another pop star flailing to find his identity amid trend-hopping production and half-baked lyrics" and that "listening to LP1, you almost feel sorry for Payne. It's maybe more pathetic to have failed not for risking too much, but after seeming to have tried so little."

Neil Z. Yeung of AllMusic wrote that Payne "tackles hip-hop and electronic genres but struggles to distinguish himself from the crop of similar-sounding contemporaries" and that a majority of the songs "sound more like a streaming playlist set to shuffle" while adding that the album is "front-loaded with mostly forgettable trifles" and "saved by this bountiful back-end, which plays like an early prediction of a potential greatest-hits collection" while advising Payne to "find a more distinctive vision and a team who can better utilize his strong vocals." Yeung also added that the album's best tracks include featured artists, particuraly praising "For You" as the album's best track while also complimenting "Familiar", "Get Low", and "Stack It Up". Writing for The Times, Will Hodgkinson called the album "dull" but praised Payne's "strong voice". A.D. Amorosi, writing for Variety, opined that "the writing and singing aren't strong enough and come across as C-level Timberlake material" while ending the review by saying "during 'Home with You', one of Payne's better singles not included on this album, the singer claims: 'Too many cooks in the kitchen / Too many fools here listening / Why don't we find somewhere quiet, quiet.' Liam Payne should have taken his own advice." Lauren Murphy of entertainment.ie called the songs "indistinguishable" and the album "a wasted opportunity" and "dull", noting that the album "sounds like a collection of songs – not a cohesive album". Thomas Green, writing for the i, stated that "One Direction's devoted fans will love this, but nobody else will" while commenting that the album "should make lots of money. Not much else about it seems to matter to Payne." He also opioned that the second half of the album, "stacked with tunes he's released over the last three years" is "more enjoyable" than the newer releases.

The album specifically received heavy criticism from critics and the general public for fetishising bisexual women in the track "Both Ways".

Some reviews were more positive, with Rachel McGrath of the Evening Standard opining that Payne "finds the perfect middle ground" and writing that the album is "perfectly packaged hits that see him reaffirm his love for hip-hop, dabble with reggaeton and even croon a Christmas track." Markos Papadatos of the Digital Journal penned that the album was "incredible", calling it "worth the wait" and "all heart and soul, and it is highly recommended for all."

Commercial performance
LP1 peaked at number 17 on the UK Albums Chart and number 111 on the US Billboard 200. As of 2020, the album has sold 10,000 copies in the US.

Track listing

Notes
 signifies an additional producer
 signifies a vocal producer
 signifies a recording producer

Credits and personnel
Credits adapted from the album's liner notes.

Recording locations

 Miami, Florida – Circle House Studios
 Los Angeles, California – Deep Cuts, MXM Studios, Sphere Studios
 Calabasas, California – Enemy Doja 
 London, United Kingdom – Hampton Studios, Real World Studios, Rokstone Studios, SARM Studios
 New York City – Jungle City Studios
 Sherman Oaks, California – Monsters and Strangerz Studios
 Venice, California – Stellar House
 Atlanta, Georgia – YRN Factory

Vocals

 Liam Payne – vocals , backing vocals 
 A Boogie wit da Hoodie – vocals 
 Ruth-Anne Cunningham – backing vocals 
 Andrew Haas – backing vocals 
 Marcus Lomax – backing vocals 
 Michael Matosic – backing vocals 
 Sam Preston – backing vocals 
 Ed Sheeran – backing vocals 
 Jake Torrey – backing vocals

Instrumentation

 Oscar Sebastian Enroth – guitar 
 Ian Franzino – drums, keyboards 
 Fred – bass guitar, drums, guitar, piano 
 Andrew Haas – bass guitar, drums, guitar, keyboards 
 Stefan Johnson – guitar 
 Steve Mac – keyboards 
 Jonny Price – piano 
 Tobias Ring – production 
 Joe Spargur – bass guitar, guitar, keyboards 
 Jake Torrey – guitar, keyboards

Production

 Afterhrs – production 
 Dylan Bauld – production 
 Trevor Dahl – production 
 DannyBoyStyles – production 
 German – production 
 Joe London – production 
 Sir Nolan – production 
 Sly – production 
 Steve Mac – production 
 Stargate – production 
 Ryan Tedder – production 
 The Monsters and the Strangerz – production 
 Aaron Z – production 
 Jonny Price – additional production 
 Tim Blacksmith – executive production 
 Danny D – executive production 
 Ben "Bengineer" Chang – recording production 
 Sam Watters – recording production 
 Gian Stone – vocal production

Technical

 Ben "Bengineer" Chang – engineering, recording 
 Ian Franzino – engineering, programming, recording 
 Andrew Haas – engineering, programming, recording 
 John Hanes – engineering 
 Daniel Pursey – engineering 
 Sir Nolan – engineering, drum programming, programming 
 Gian Stone – engineering 
 Connor Mason – assistant recording engineering 
 Jeff Gunnell – assistant recording engineering 
 Bill Zimmerman – assistant recording engineering , mix engineering , engineering , assistant editing 
 Aaron Z – assistant recording engineering, drum programming, programming 
 Ben Rice – vocal engineering 
 DannyBoyStyles – programming 
 Chris Laws – programming 
 Joe Spargur – programming 
 Stargate – programming, recording 
 The Monsters and the Strangerz – programming 
 Sandy Vee – programming, recording 
 Serge Courtois – mixing 
 Serban Ghenea – mixing 
 Phil Tan – mixing 
 Randy Merrill – mastering

Design
 Big Active – art direction and design
 Jason Hetherington – photography

Charts

Certifications

Release history

References

2019 debut albums
Liam Payne albums
Capitol Records albums
Albums produced by Andrew Watt (record producer)
Albums produced by Ryan Tedder
Albums produced by Stargate
Albums produced by Steve Mac